Mayur Vihar Pocket 1 is a metro station located on the Pink Line of the Delhi Metro. It as part of Phase III of the Delhi Metro Network. The station was opened on 31 December 2018.

History 
The construction of this station started in 2013  and it was completed around mid 2018.

Station layout

Facilities 
This station has facility of electronic rickshaws.

Connections 
St. John's Model School and Pocket 3 market are nearest.
South Indian temple Sree Guruvayurappan Temple is the main attraction near pocket 1 station. We have jeevan anmol hospital. Phase 1 police station and Kukreja hospital accessible from here.

References

External links

 Delhi Metro Rail Corporation Ltd. (Official site)
 Delhi Metro Annual Reports
 
 UrbanRail.Net – descriptions of all metro systems in the world, each with a schematic map showing all stations.

Delhi Metro stations
Railway stations in East Delhi district